Baselios Poulose II Catholicos College (often abbreviated as BPC College), is an aided college located at Piravom in the Ernakulam district of the Indian state of Kerala. The institution affiliated to Mahatma Gandhi University, was re-accredited with A grade by NAAC in 2021.

Established in 1995 Baselios Poulose II Catholicos College in the aided sector, offers instructions in the arts, technology and management. This institution has permanent affiliation to Mahatma Gandhi University and all the degree courses are under aided sector of the Government of Kerala.

History
BPC College was first established in 1995 at Mamala Kavala near the Pazhoor Perumthrikkovil temple in Piravom. Later it was changed to a mount (now known as Baselios Mount) in Illikkamukkada, a place in Piravom-Pala route.

Coat of arms
This reveals that when the Earth is immersed in water, two hands raises the Holy Bible before Eye of Providence, during the end times, when everybody understands God and realizes what the cross on top of the Bible is.

Academic courses
Master's degree in Electronics      (M.Sc.)
Master's degree in Computer Science (M.Sc.)
Master of Commerce and Management (M.C.M)
Bachelor of Computer Applications (B.C.A)
Bachelor of Business Administration (B.B.A)
Bachelor of Science in Electronics (B.Sc.)
Bachelor of Arts in English with Journalism (B.A.)
Bachelor of Commerce with Computer Applications (B.Com.C. A.)
Certificate Course in Communication Skills (U.G.C. sponsored)
Certificate Course in Human Rights (U.G.C. Sponsored)
Coaching Classes for entry in service (U.G.C. Sponsored)

Mode of admission
Candidates for admission will have passed the higher secondary examination conducted by boards or departments recognized by the university, obtaining not less than 50% marks.

Facilities
 Computer Laboratory 	  	 
 Library 
 Canteen
 Hostels for Boys and Girls
 Basketball Court 	 	  	 
 National Service Scheme
 National Cadet Corps
 Nature Club

Notable alumni
 Kuldeep Pai, Indian Musician

Institutions under the same management
 Baselios Poulose Second College, Piramadom

External links 
 Official website of the college
 Conference website of the Department of Electronics, BPC College
 International Conference on Electronics and Advanced Signal Processing (ICESP2020)
Official blog of Alumni Association
 Blog of the Department of Electronics
 List of colleges affiliated with Mahatma Gandhi University

Christian universities and colleges in India
Arts and Science colleges in Kerala
Colleges affiliated to Mahatma Gandhi University, Kerala
Universities and colleges in Ernakulam district
1995 establishments in Kerala
Educational institutions established in 1995